Thị Nại Port is the second largest port in Bình Định Province, Vietnam. It is located in Hai Cang (meaning sea port) ward at the eastern tip of Quy Nhơn city. In 2009, 644 tons of goods were handled in Thị Nại Port, of which 113 tons were exported and 3 tons imported.

History
Thị Nại was widely considered as the first port of Champa from the eleventh century to the later fifteenth century. At this time, Thị Nại played an important role in the trading between China, Southeast Asia and Southwest Asia countries. Thị Nại port was also a regional trading center of Champa.

After the Vietnamese destroyed the kingdom of Champa, Thị Nại stayed a trading port. Following the Tây Sơn rebellions, Thị Nại port became a naval port.

In mid 20th century, the government of South Vietnam rebuilt Thị Nại into a supporting naval port. After 1975, the Thị Nại port was continuously used as a naval port until recent years.

References

  Đỗ Trường Giang (2008), The transformation of Cham's trade port into Viet one (the case of Thi Nai - Nuoc Man)  [Sự chuyển hoá từ thương cảng Chăm sang Việt (trường hợp Thị Nại - Nước Mặn) ) Nghiên cứu Đông Nam Á . No 8. p. 71-76. .
 Thi Nai Seaport: Renovation for Development
 Quy Nhon at Columbia Encyclopedia.

Ports and harbours of Vietnam
Buildings and structures in Bình Định province
Geography of Bình Định province